Pastramă is a popular delicatessen meat traditionally in Romania made from lamb and also from pork and mutton.

Pastramă was originally created as a way to preserve meat before modern refrigeration. For pastrami, the raw meat is brined, partly dried, seasoned with various herbs and spices, then smoked and steamed. 
At the beginning, pastramă was a speciality from Wallachia made from young ram's meat.

The word pastramă is etymologically rooted in the Romanian a păstra, which means "to keep" or "to preserve". But the word is maybe more ancient and comes from the Latin pastor who means shepherd. So Pastramă is shepherd's meat so lamb or mutton.

Pastramă was introduced by Romans to the city of Caesarea Mazaca in Anatolia, known as pastron. This recipe may be the origin of pastirma.

In 455 AD the Gepids under king Ardarich conquered Pannonia, settled for two centuries in Transylvania. The Gepids was destroyed by the attack of Lombards in 567 AD. At this time, the lombards discovered pastramă, known as bresaola.

Pastramă was introduced to the United States in a wave of Romanian Jewish immigration from Romania in the second half of the 19th century. Early references in English used the spelling "pastrama", closer to the Romanian original. The modified "pastrami" spelling likely was introduced to sound related to the Italian salami.

See also 

 List of meat dishes
 Pastirma
 Pastrami
 Schwartz's

Notes and references 

 

Romanian delicatessen
Uncooked meat dishes

ar:بسطرمة
he:פסטרמה
ja:パストラミ
ro:Pastramă
ru:Пастрома